The Macedonian Journal of Chemistry and Chemical Engineering is a peer-reviewed scientific journal of chemistry established in 1974 by the Society of Chemists and Technologists of Macedonia. Since 2022 it is co-published with the Ss. Cyril and Methodius University of Skopje. It consists of two parts: The first, larger part contains peer-reviewed scientific articles from the various fields of chemistry and chemical engineering, written in English and accompanied by abstracts in Macedonian. The second part, written in Macedonian or in English, contains society and related news.

The journal was first published as the Bulletin of the Chemists and Technologists of Macedonia in 1974, and obtained its current name in 2007. The journal and the articles published since 2006 are available online. It is a diamond open access journal, neither the readers nor the authors pay any fees.

Editors-in-chief
The following have been editors-in-chief:
Bojan Šoptrajanov (1974)
Svetomir Hadži-Jordanov (1989)
Gligor Jovanovski (1993)
Maja Cvetkovska (1997)
Trajče Stafilov (2001)
Eleonora Winkelhausen (2005)
Zoran Zdravkovski (2009)

References

External links

Biannual journals
Chemistry journals
Chemical engineering journals
Multilingual journals
Creative Commons Attribution-licensed journals